Methane is a chemical compound with the chemical formula  (one carbon atom bonded to four hydrogen atoms). It is a group-14 hydride, the simplest alkane, and the main constituent of natural gas. The relative abundance of methane on Earth makes it an economically attractive fuel, although capturing and storing it poses technical challenges due to its gaseous state under normal conditions for temperature and pressure.

Naturally occurring methane is found both below ground and under the seafloor and is formed by both geological and biological processes. The largest reservoir of methane is under the seafloor in the form of methane clathrates. When methane reaches the surface and the atmosphere, it is known as atmospheric methane. 

The Earth's atmospheric methane concentration has increased by about 260% since 1750with the overwhelming percentage caused by human activity and accounted for 20% of the total radiative forcing from all of the long-lived and globally mixed greenhouse gases, according to the 2021 Intergovernmental Panel on Climate Change report. 

It has also been detected on other planets, including Mars, which has implications for astrobiology research.

Properties and bonding
Methane is a tetrahedral molecule with four equivalent C–H bonds. Its electronic structure is described by four bonding molecular orbitals (MOs) resulting from the overlap of the valence orbitals on C and H. The lowest-energy MO is the result of the overlap of the 2s orbital on carbon with the in-phase combination of the 1s orbitals on the four hydrogen atoms. Above this energy level is a triply degenerate set of MOs that involve overlap of the 2p orbitals on carbon with various linear combinations of the 1s orbitals on hydrogen. The resulting "three-over-one" bonding scheme is consistent with photoelectron spectroscopic measurements.

Methane is an odorless gas and appears to be colorless. It does absorb visible light especially at the red end of the spectrum due to overtone bands, but the effect is only noticeable if the light path is very long. This is what gives Uranus and Neptune their blue or bluish-green colors, as light passes through their atmospheres containing methane and is then scattered back out.

The familiar smell of natural gas as used in homes is achieved by the addition of an odorant, usually blends containing tert-butylthiol, as a safety measure. Methane has a boiling point of −161.5 °C at a pressure of one atmosphere. As a gas, it is flammable over a range of concentrations (5.4–17%) in air at standard pressure.

Solid methane exists in several modifications. Presently nine are known. Cooling methane at normal pressure results in the formation of methane I. This substance crystallizes in the cubic system (space group Fmm). The positions of the hydrogen atoms are not fixed in methane I, i.e. methane molecules may rotate freely. Therefore, it is a plastic crystal.

Chemical reactions
The primary chemical reactions of methane are combustion, steam reforming to syngas, and halogenation. In general, methane reactions are difficult to control.

Selective oxidation
Partial oxidation of methane to methanol, a more convenient, liquid fuel, is challenging because the reaction typically progresses all the way to carbon dioxide and water even with an insufficient supply of oxygen. The enzyme methane monooxygenase produces methanol from methane, but cannot be used for industrial-scale reactions. Some homogeneously catalyzed systems and heterogeneous systems have been developed, but all have significant drawbacks. These generally operate by generating protected products which are shielded from overoxidation. Examples include the Catalytica system, copper zeolites, and iron zeolites stabilizing the alpha-oxygen active site.

One group of bacteria catalyze methane oxidation with nitrite as the oxidant in the absence of oxygen, giving rise to the so-called anaerobic oxidation of methane.

Acid–base reactions
Like other hydrocarbons, methane is an extremely weak acid. Its pKa in DMSO is estimated to be 56. It cannot be deprotonated in solution, but the conjugate base is known in forms such as methyllithium.

A variety of positive ions derived from methane have been observed, mostly as unstable species in low-pressure gas mixtures. These include methenium or methyl cation , methane cation , and methanium or protonated methane . Some of these have been detected in outer space. Methanium can also be produced as diluted solutions from methane with superacids.

Despite the strength of its C–H bonds, there is intense interest in catalysts that facilitate C–H bond activation in methane (and other lower numbered alkanes).

Combustion

Methane's heat of combustion is 55.5 MJ/kg. Combustion of methane is a multiple step reaction summarized as follows:
CH4 + 2 O2 -> CO2 + 2 H2O 
(at standard conditions)
Peters four-step chemistry is a systematically reduced four-step chemistry that explains the burning of methane.

Methane radical reactions
Given appropriate conditions, methane reacts with halogen radicals as follows:

where X is a halogen: fluorine (F), chlorine (Cl), bromine (Br), or iodine (I). This mechanism for this process is called free radical halogenation. It is initiated when UV light or some other radical initiator (like peroxides) produces a halogen atom. A two-step chain reaction ensues in which the halogen atom abstracts a hydrogen atom from a methane molecule, resulting in the formation of a hydrogen halide molecule and a methyl radical. The methyl radical then reacts with a molecule of the halogen to form a molecule of the halomethane, with a new halogen atom as byproduct. Similar reactions can occur on the halogenated product, leading to replacement of additional hydrogen atoms by halogen atoms with dihalomethane, trihalomethane, and ultimately, tetrahalomethane structures, depending upon reaction conditions and the halogen-to-methane ratio.

Uses
Methane is used in industrial chemical processes and may be transported as a refrigerated liquid (liquefied natural gas, or LNG). While leaks from a refrigerated liquid container are initially heavier than air due to the increased density of the cold gas, the gas at ambient temperature is lighter than air. Gas pipelines distribute large amounts of natural gas, of which methane is the principal component.

Fuel
Methane is used as a fuel for ovens, homes, water heaters, kilns, automobiles, turbines, etc. Activated carbon is used to store methane. 

As the major constituent of natural gas, methane is important for electricity generation by burning it as a fuel in a gas turbine or steam generator. Compared to other hydrocarbon fuels, methane produces less carbon dioxide for each unit of heat released. At about 891 kJ/mol, methane's heat of combustion is lower than that of any other hydrocarbon, but the ratio of the heat of combustion (891 kJ/mol) to the molecular mass (16.0 g/mol, of which 12.0 g/mol is carbon) shows that methane, being the simplest hydrocarbon, produces more heat per mass unit (55.7 kJ/g) than other complex hydrocarbons. In many cities, methane is piped into homes for domestic heating and cooking. In this context it is usually known as natural gas, which is considered to have an energy content of 39 megajoules per cubic meter, or 1,000 BTU per standard cubic foot. Liquefied natural gas (LNG) is predominantly methane (CH4) converted into liquid form for ease of storage or transport.

Refined liquid methane as well as LNG is used as a rocket fuel, when combined with liquid oxygen, as in the BE-4 and Raptor engines. Due to the similarities between methane and LNG such engines are commonly grouped together under the term methalox.

As a liquid rocket propellant, methane offers the advantage over kerosene of producing small exhaust molecules.  This deposits less soot on the internal parts of rocket motors, reducing the difficulty of booster re-use.  The lower molecular weight of the exhaust also increases the fraction of the heat energy which is in the form of kinetic energy available for propulsion, increasing the specific impulse of the rocket. Compared to liquid hydrogen, the specific energy of methane is lower but this disadvantage is offset by methane's greater density and temperature range, allowing for smaller and lighter tankage for a given fuel mass. Liquid methane has a temperature range (91–112 K) nearly compatible with liquid oxygen (54–90 K).

Chemical feedstock
Natural gas, which is mostly composed of methane, is used to produce hydrogen gas on an industrial scale. Steam methane reforming (SMR), or simply known as steam reforming, is the standard industrial method of producing commercial bulk hydrogen gas. More than 50 million metric tons are produced annually worldwide (2013), principally from the SMR of natural gas. Much of this hydrogen is used in petroleum refineries, in the production of chemicals and in food processing. Very large quantities of hydrogen are used in the industrial synthesis of ammonia.

At high temperatures (700–1100 °C) and in the presence of a metal-based catalyst (nickel), steam reacts with methane to yield a mixture of CO and H2, known as "water gas" or "syngas":

 CH4 + H2O <=> CO + 3 H2

This reaction is strongly endothermic (consumes heat,  206 kJ/mol).
Additional hydrogen is obtained by the reaction of CO with water via the water-gas shift reaction:

 CO + H2O <=> CO2 + H2

This reaction is mildly exothermic (produces heat,  −41 kJ/mol).

Methane is also subjected to free-radical chlorination in the production of chloromethanes, although methanol is a more typical precursor.

Hydrogen can also be produced via the direct decomposition of methane, also known as methane Pyrolysis. Unlike steam reforming, the methane pyrolysis reaction itself does not produce greenhouse gases. The heat needed for the reaction can be GHG emission free, too, e.g. from concentrated sunlight, renewable electricity or burning some of the produced hydrogen. If the methane is from biogas then the process can be a carbon sink. Temperatures in excess of 1200 °C are required to break the bonds of methane to produce Hydrogen gas and solid carbon. However, through the use of a suitable catalyst the reaction temperature can be reduced to between 600 °C - 1000 °C depending on the chosen catalyst. The reaction is moderately endothermic as shown in the reaction equation below.

 CH4_{(g)} -> C_{(s)}{} + 2 H2_{(g)} 
( 74.8 kJ/mol)

Generation

Geological routes 

The two main routes for geological methane generation are (i) organic (thermally generated, or thermogenic) and (ii) inorganic (abiotic). Thermogenic methane occurs due to the breakup of organic matter at elevated temperatures and pressures in deep sedimentary strata. Most methane in sedimentary basins is thermogenic; therefore, thermogenic methane is the most important source of natural gas. Thermogenic methane components are typically considered to be relic (from an earlier time). Generally, formation of thermogenic methane (at depth) can occur through organic matter breakup, or organic synthesis. Both ways can involve microorganisms (methanogenesis), but may also occur inorganically. The processes involved can also consume methane, with and without microorganisms.

The more important source of methane at depth (crystalline bedrock) is abiotic. Abiotic means that methane is created from inorganic compounds, without biological activity, either through magmatic processes or via water-rock reactions that occur at low temperatures and pressures, like serpentinization.

Biological routes

Most of Earth's methane is biogenic and is produced by methanogenesis, a form of anaerobic respiration only known to be conducted by some members of the domain Archaea. Methanogens occupy landfills and other soils, ruminants (for example, cattle), the guts of termites, and the anoxic sediments below the seafloor and the bottom of lakes. Rice fields also generate large amounts of methane during plant growth. This multistep process is used by these microorganisms for energy. The net reaction of methanogenesis is:

CO2 + 4 H2 -> CH4 + 2 H2O

The final step in the process is catalyzed by the enzyme methyl coenzyme M reductase (MCR).

Ruminants
Ruminants, such as cattle, belch methane, accounting for about 22% of the U.S. annual methane emissions to the atmosphere. One study reported that the livestock sector in general (primarily cattle, chickens, and pigs) produces 37% of all human-induced methane.  A 2013 study estimated that livestock accounted for 44% of human-induced methane and about 15% of human-induced greenhouse gas emissions. Many efforts are underway to reduce livestock methane production, such as medical treatments and dietary adjustments, and to trap the gas to use its combustion energy.

Seafloor sediments 
Most of the subseafloor is anoxic because oxygen is removed by aerobic microorganisms within the first few centimeters of the sediment. Below the oxygen-replete seafloor, methanogens produce methane that is either used by other organisms or becomes trapped in gas hydrates. These other organisms that utilize methane for energy are known as methanotrophs ('methane-eating'), and are the main reason why little methane generated at depth reaches the sea surface. Consortia of Archaea and Bacteria have been found to oxidize methane via anaerobic oxidation of methane (AOM); the organisms responsible for this are anaerobic methanotrophic Archaea (ANME) and sulfate-reducing bacteria (SRB).

Industrial routes

Given its cheap abundance in natural gas, there is little incentive to produce methane industrially. Methane can be produced by hydrogenating carbon dioxide through the Sabatier process. Methane is also a side product of the hydrogenation of carbon monoxide in the Fischer–Tropsch process, which is practiced on a large scale to produce longer-chain molecules than methane.

An example of large-scale coal-to-methane gasification is the Great Plains Synfuels plant, started in 1984 in Beulah, North Dakota as a way to develop abundant local resources of low-grade lignite, a resource that is otherwise difficult to transport for its weight, ash content, low calorific value and propensity to spontaneous combustion during storage and transport. A number of similar plants exist around the world, although mostly these plants are targeted towards the production of long chain alkanes for use as gasoline, diesel, or feedstock to other processes.

Power to methane is a technology that uses electrical power to produce hydrogen from water by electrolysis and uses the Sabatier reaction to combine hydrogen with carbon dioxide to produce methane. As of 2021, this is mostly under development and not in large-scale use. Theoretically, the process could be used as a buffer for excess and off-peak power generated by highly fluctuating wind turbines and solar arrays. However, as currently very large amounts of natural gas are used in power plants (e.g. CCGT) to produce electric energy, the losses in efficiency are not acceptable.

Laboratory synthesis
Methane can be produced by protonation of methyl lithium or a methyl Grignard reagent such as methylmagnesium chloride. It can also be made from anhydrous sodium acetate and dry sodium hydroxide, mixed and heated above 300 °C (with sodium carbonate as byproduct). In practice, a requirement for pure methane can easily be fulfilled by steel gas bottle from standard gas suppliers.

Occurrence
Methane was discovered and isolated by Alessandro Volta between 1776 and 1778 when studying marsh gas from Lake Maggiore. It is the major component of natural gas, about 87% by volume. The major source of methane is extraction from geological deposits known as natural gas fields, with coal seam gas extraction becoming a major source (see coal bed methane extraction, a method for extracting methane from a coal deposit, while enhanced coal bed methane recovery is a method of recovering methane from non-mineable coal seams). It is associated with other hydrocarbon fuels, and sometimes accompanied by helium and nitrogen. Methane is produced at shallow levels (low pressure) by anaerobic decay of organic matter and reworked methane from deep under the Earth's surface. In general, the sediments that generate natural gas are buried deeper and at higher temperatures than those that contain oil.

Methane is generally transported in bulk by pipeline in its natural gas form, or by LNG carriers in its liquefied form; few countries transport it by truck.

Atmospheric methane and climate change

Global monitoring of atmospheric methane concentrations began in the 1980s. The Earth's atmospheric methane concentration has increased 260% since preindustrial levels in the mid-18th century, according to the 2022 United Nations Environment Programme's (UNEP) "Global Methane Assessment". The largest annual increase occurred in 2021 with the overwhelming percentage caused by human activity. Atmospheric methane accounted for 20% of the total radiative forcing from all of the long-lived and globally mixed greenhouse gases. The AR6 of the IPCC states: "Observed increases in well-mixed greenhouse gas (GHG) concentrations since around 1750 are unequivocally caused by human activities. Since 2011 (measurements reported in AR5), concentrations have continued to increase in the atmosphere, reaching annual averages of 410 ppm for carbon dioxide (CO2), 1866 ppb for methane (CH4), and 332 ppb for nitrous oxide (N2O) in 2019. (…) In 2019, atmospheric CO2 concentrations were higher than at any time in at least 2 million years (high confidence), and concentrations of CH4 and N2O were higher than at any time in at least 800,000 years (very high confidence). Since 1750, increases in CO2 (47%) and CH4 (156%) concentrations far exceed, and increases in N2O (23%) are similar to, the natural multi-millennial changes between glacial and interglacial periods over at least the past 800,000 years (very high confidence)". The largest annual increase occurred in 2021 with current concentrations reaching a record 260% of pre-industrialwith the overwhelming percentage caused by human activity. 

Historic methane concentrations in the world's atmosphere have ranged between 300 and 400 nmol/mol during glacial periods commonly known as ice ages, and between 600 and 700 nmol/mol during the warm interglacial periods. A 2012 NASA website said the oceans were a potential important source of Arctic methane, but more recent studies associate increasing methane levels as caused by human activity.

Methane is an important greenhouse gas with a global warming potential of 40 compared to CO2 (potential of 1) over a 100-year period, and above 80 over a 20-year period.

From 2015 to 2019 sharp rises in levels of atmospheric methane have been recorded.  In February 2020, it was reported that fugitive emissions and gas venting from the fossil fuel industry may have been significantly underestimated.

Climate change can increase atmospheric methane levels by increasing methane production in natural ecosystems, forming a climate change feedback. Another explanation for the rise in methane emissions could be a slowdown of the chemical reaction that removes methane from the atmosphere.

Clathrates
Methane clathrates (also known as methane hydrates) are solid cages of water molecules that trap single molecules of methane. Significant reservoirs of methane clathrates have been found in arctic permafrost and along continental margins beneath the ocean floor within the gas clathrate stability zone, located at high pressures (1 to 100 MPa; lower end requires lower temperature) and low temperatures (< 15 °C; upper end requires higher pressure). Methane clathrates can form from biogenic methane, thermogenic methane, or a mix of the two. These deposits are both a potential source of methane fuel as well as a potential contributor to global warming. The global mass of carbon stored in gas clathrates is still uncertain and has been estimated as high as 12,500 Gt carbon and as low as 500 Gt carbon. The estimate has declined over time with a most recent estimate of ~1800 Gt carbon. A large part of this uncertainty is due to our knowledge gap in sources and sinks of methane and the distribution of methane clathrates at the global scale. For example, a source of methane was discovered relatively recently in an ultraslow spreading ridge in the Arctic. Some climate models suggest that today's methane emission regime from the ocean floor is potentially similar to that during the period of the Paleocene–Eocene Thermal Maximum (PETM) around 55.5 million years ago, although there are no data indicating that methane from clathrate dissociation currently reaches the atmosphere. Arctic methane release from permafrost and seafloor methane clathrates is a potential consequence and further cause of global warming; this is known as the clathrate gun hypothesis. Data from 2016 indicate that Arctic permafrost thaws faster than predicted.

Extraterrestrial methane

Interstellar medium
Methane is abundant in many parts of the Solar System and potentially could be harvested on the surface of another solar-system body (in particular, using methane production from local materials found on Mars or Titan), providing fuel for a return journey.

Mars
Methane has been detected on all planets of the Solar System and most of the larger moons. With the possible exception of Mars, it is believed to have come from abiotic processes.

The Curiosity rover has documented seasonal fluctuations of atmospheric methane levels on Mars. These fluctuations peaked at the end of the Martian summer at 0.6 parts per billion.

Methane has been proposed as a possible rocket propellant on future Mars missions due in part to the possibility of synthesizing it on the planet by in situ resource utilization. An adaptation of the Sabatier methanation reaction may be used with a mixed catalyst bed and a reverse water-gas shift in a single reactor to produce methane from the raw materials available on Mars, utilizing water from the Martian subsoil and carbon dioxide in the Martian atmosphere.

Methane could be produced by a non-biological process called serpentinization involving water, carbon dioxide, and the mineral olivine, which is known to be common on Mars.

History

In November 1776, methane was first scientifically identified by Italian physicist Alessandro Volta in the marshes of Lake Maggiore straddling Italy and Switzerland.  Volta was inspired to search for the substance after reading a paper written by Benjamin Franklin about "flammable air". Volta collected the gas rising from the marsh, and by 1778 had isolated pure methane. He also demonstrated that the gas could be ignited with an electric spark.

Following the Felling mine disaster of 1812 in which 92 men perished, Sir Humphry Davy established that the feared firedamp was in fact largely methane.

The name "methane" was coined in 1866 by the German chemist August Wilhelm von Hofmann. The name was derived from methanol.

Etymology
The radical is named after this because it was first detected in methanol, an alcohol first isolated by distillation of wood. The chemical suffix -ane is from the coordinating chemical suffix -ine which is from Latin feminine suffix -ina which is applied to represent abstracts. The coordination of "-ane", "-ene", "-one", etc. was proposed in 1866 by German chemist August Wilhelm von Hofmann.

Abbreviations
The abbreviation CH4-C can mean the mass of carbon contained in a mass of methane, and the mass of methane is always 1.33 times the mass of CH4-C. CH4-C can also mean the methane-carbon ratio, which is 1.33 by mass. Methane at scales of the atmosphere is commonly measured in teragrams (Tg CH4) or millions of metric tons (MMT CH4), which mean the same thing.  Other standard units are also used, such as nanomole (nmol, one billionth of a mole), mole (mol), kilogram, and gram.

Public safety and the environment

Methane "degrades air quality and adversely impacts human health, agricultural yields, and ecosystem productivity".

Methane is extremely flammable and may form explosive mixtures with air. Methane gas explosions are responsible for many deadly mining disasters. A methane gas explosion was the cause of the Upper Big Branch coal mine disaster in West Virginia on April 5, 2010, killing 29. Natural gas accidental release has also been a major focus in the field of safety engineering, due to past accidental releases that concluded in the formation of jet fire disasters.

The 2015-2016 methane gas leak in Aliso Canyon, California was considered to be the worst in terms of its environmental effect in American history. It was also described as more damaging to the environment than Deepwater Horizon's leak in the Gulf of Mexico.

Methane is also an asphyxiant if the oxygen concentration is reduced to below about 16% by displacement, as most people can tolerate a reduction from 21% to 16% without ill effects. The concentration of methane at which asphyxiation risk becomes significant is much higher than the 5–15% concentration in a flammable or explosive mixture. Methane off-gas can penetrate the interiors of buildings near landfills and expose occupants to significant levels of methane. Some buildings have specially engineered recovery systems below their basements to actively capture this gas and vent it away from the building.

See also

Explanatory notes

Citations

Cited sources

External links

 Methane at The Periodic Table of Videos (University of Nottingham)
 International Chemical Safety Card 0291
 Gas (Methane) Hydrates – A New Frontier – United States Geological Survey
 
 CDC – Handbook for Methane Control in Mining

 
Anaerobic digestion
Fuel gas
Fuels
Gaseous signaling molecules
Greenhouse gases
Industrial gases